Pistolero is the Spanish word for gunfighter.

Pistolero may also refer to:

 Pistolero (album), by Frank Black and the Catholics
 "Pistolero" (song), by Juno Reactor
 "Pistolero" (Dschinghis Khan song), by Dschinghis Khan
 Alberto Contador, Spanish cyclist nicknamed "El Pistolero"
 Luis Suárez, Uruguayan footballer nicknamed "El Pistolero"
 Kostas Mitroglou, Greek footballer nicknamed "Pistolero"
Pistolera may refer to:
 Pistolera (DC Comics), a comic book supervillain
 Pistolera (band), a Brooklyn band